The Rocky Horror Picture Show is a 1975 musical comedy horror film directed by Jim Sharman.

The Rocky Horror Picture Show may also refer to:
 The Rocky Horror Picture Show (soundtrack)
 The Rocky Horror Show, a 1973 musical by Richard O'Brien
 Rocky Horror Show Live, a 2015 simulcast
 The Rocky Horror Picture Show: Let's Do the Time Warp Again, a 2016 musical television film

Other
 "The Rocky Horror Glee Show", an episode of the American television series Glee, paying tribute to the 1973 musical and its 1975 film adaptation
 The Rocky Horror Punk Rock Show, an album by punk rock bands
 The Rocky Horror Picture Show cult following
 Rocky Horror sequels and other media

See also